BAPLA is the trade association of UK based photographic image suppliers, commercial picture libraries and agencies.

History
The association was formed in 1975 with founding members: Ardea Photographics, Aspect Picture Library, BBC Picture Library, Black Star Publishing Co., Camera Press Ltd, Bruce Coleman Ltd, Colorific Photo Library, Colour Library International, Feature Pix Colour Library, Susan Griggs Agency, Robert Harding Picture Library, Keystone Press Agency, Frank Lane Photographic Agency, Pictor International Ltd, Picturepoint Ltd, Popper Photo Library, Spectrum Colour Library, Tony Stone Associates  and Transworld Features.

Structure
It is situated on Tranquil Vale in Blackheath near Blackheath railway station on the B212.

BAPLA is steered by an elected voluntary Executive Board of eight directors.

References

External links
 BAPLA

Trade associations based in the United Kingdom
Organizations established in 1975
Media and communications in the London Borough of Lewisham
British photography organisations
Photo archives in the United Kingdom
1975 establishments in the United Kingdom
Organisations based in the London Borough of Lewisham